Laurens ten Heuvel (born 6 June 1976) is a Dutch former professional footballer and coach.

Playing career
Ten Heuvel formerly played for FC Den Bosch, Barnsley, Northampton Town, First Vienna FC, Stormvogels Telstar, Sheffield United, Bradford City, Grimsby Town, De Graafschap, and RBC Roosendaal. Whilst at Barnsley he played twice in the Premier League against Aston Villa and Southampton.

Coaching career
In 2014 he was named Head Coach of SV Zandvoort, and in 2017 he took charge of Koninklijke HFC.

Personal life
Ten Heuvel is the older brother of Arturo ten Heuvel.

References

External links

 Player profile at Voetbal International

1976 births
Living people
Footballers from Amsterdam
Expatriate footballers in England
Dutch footballers
Dutch expatriate footballers
FC Den Bosch players
Barnsley F.C. players
Northampton Town F.C. players
Sheffield United F.C. players
Bradford City A.F.C. players
Grimsby Town F.C. players
De Graafschap players
HFC Haarlem players
SC Telstar players
RBC Roosendaal players
VV Katwijk players
First Vienna FC players
Premier League players
English Football League players
Eerste Divisie players
Expatriate footballers in Austria
Association football forwards